Tihamér is a masculine given name, the Hungarian form of the Slavic Tihomir, and may refer to:

 Tihamér Margitay (1859–1922), Hungarian painter
 Tihamér Lukács (1980-), Hungarian footballer
 Tihamér Fabinyi (1890-1953), Hungarian politician

References 

Hungarian masculine given names
Masculine given names